The Pennsylvania Anthracite Heritage Museum preserves the heritage of anthracite coal mining in the U.S. State of Pennsylvania and is located in McDade Park in Scranton. It features exhibits detailing the industrial history of northeastern Pennsylvania.

The museum is part of Anthracite Museum Complex, created in 1971 by Pennsylvania Historical and Museum Commission, which includes three museums and one historical site located in there communities:

 The Pennsylvania Anthracite Heritage Museum and the Scranton Iron Furnaces, both in Scranton, Lackawanna County
 Eckley Miners' Village near Weatherly, Luzerne County
 The Museum of Anthracite Mining overlooking the community of Ashland in Schuylkill County

The museum was featured on The Office episode "The Merger" in Michael and Dwight's parody of Lazy Sunday.

A few museum exhibits are also located at the companion Lackawana Coal Mine Tour.

References

External links 
 Official Pennsylvania Anthracite Heritage Museum website

Museums in Scranton, Pennsylvania
Mining museums in Pennsylvania
Industry museums in Pennsylvania
Lackawanna Heritage Valley